Walter Noll (January 7, 1925  June 6, 2017) was a mathematician, and Professor Emeritus at Carnegie Mellon University. He is best known for developing mathematical tools of classical mechanics, thermodynamics, and continuum mechanics.

Biography
Born in Berlin, Germany, Noll had his school education in a suburb of Berlin. In 1954, Noll earned a Ph.D. in Applied Mathematics from Indiana University under Clifford Truesdell.

His thesis "On the Continuity of the Solid and Fluid States" was published both in Journal of Rational Mechanics and Analysis and in one of Truesdell's books. Noll thanks Jerald Ericksen for his critical input to the thesis.

Noll has served as a visiting professor at the Johns Hopkins University, the University of Karlsruhe, the Israel Institute of Technology, the Institut National Polytechnique de Lorraine in Nancy, the University of Pisa, the University of Pavia, and the University of Oxford.

In 2012 he became a fellow of the American Mathematical Society. Noll died on June 6, 2017 at the age of 92.

Principle of material objectivity
In continuum mechanics, Noll introduced the so-called principle of material objectivity, which states that the constitutive laws governing the internal conditions of a physical system and the interactions between its parts should not depend on whatever external frame of reference is used to describe them.

"Principle of material objectivity" is now an obsolete term that has been replaced by principle of material frame-indifference.

Books
Noll, Walter and Truesdell, Clifford (1965) The Non-Linear Field Theories of Mechanics. Springer-Verlag, New York. .
Noll, Walter; Coleman, B. D.; and Markovitz, H. (1966) Viscometric Flows of Non-Newtonian Fluids, Theory and Experiment. Springer-Verlag, New York. ASIN B0006BN90G.
Noll, Walter (1974) Foundations of Mechanics and Thermodynamics, Selected Papers. Springer-Verlag, New York. .
Noll, Walter (1987) Finite-Dimensional Spaces: Algebra, Geometry, and Analysis, Vol. I. Kluwer Academic Publishers. . A corrected version (2006) is published on Professor Noll's website.
Noll, Walter (2004) Five Contributions to Natural Philosophy. Published on Professor Noll's website

References

External links

Professor Noll's Carnegie Mellon home page
Professor Noll's website
Obituary: Walter Noll, Pittsburgh Post-Gazette, June 11, 2017

2017 deaths
1925 births
20th-century American mathematicians
21st-century American mathematicians
Carnegie Mellon University faculty
Fellows of the American Mathematical Society
German emigrants to the United States
Indiana University alumni
Johns Hopkins University faculty
Academic staff of the Karlsruhe Institute of Technology
Scientists from Berlin
Academic staff of the University of Pavia
Academic staff of the University of Pisa